The following outline offers an overview and guide to transgender topics.

The term "transgender" is multi-faceted and complex, especially where consensual and precise definitions have not yet been reached. While often the best way to find out how  people identify themselves is to ask them, not all persons who might be thought of as falling under the transgender 'umbrella' identify as such. Transgender can also be distinguished from intersex, a term for people born with physical sex characteristics "that do not fit typical binary notions of male or female bodies".

Books and articles written about transgender people or culture are often outdated by the time they are published, if not already outdated at the time of composition, due to inappropriate and/or outdated questions or premises. Psychology, medicine, and social sciences research, aid, or otherwise interact with or study about transgender people. Each field starts from a different point of view, offers different perspectives, and uses different nomenclature. This difference is mirrored by the attitude of transgender people as regards transgender issues, which can be seen in the articles listed below.

People and behaviour
 Transgender
 Trans man
 Trans woman
 Transgender youth
 List of transgender people
 Transsexual
 Non-binary
 List of people with non-binary gender identities
 Genderfluidity
 Cross-dressing
 En femme
 En homme
 Transvestism
 Dual-role transvestism
 Drag
 Drag queen
 Drag king
 Faux queen
 En travesti
 Pantomime dame
 Gender neutrality
 Androgyny
 Gender bender
 Gender variance
 Packing (phallus)
 Tucking
 Shemale
 Feminization (activity)
 Third gender
 Transvestic fetishism
 Transsexual pornography

In non-Western cultures
 Akava'ine (Cook Islands)
 Bacchá (Central Asia)
 Bakla (Philippines)
 Bissu (Indonesia)
 Calabai (Indonesia)
 Eunuch
 Fakaleiti (Tonga)
 Fa'afafine (Samoa)
 Femminiello (Neapolitan)
 Galli (ancient Rome)
 Hijra
 Kathoey (Thailand)
 Khanith (Arabia)
 Khawal (Egypt)
 Koekchuch (Siberia)
 Köçek (Turkey)
 Mahu wahine (Hawaii)
 Maknyah (Malaysia)
 Meti (Nepal)
 Mudoko dako (the Langi in Uganda)
 Mukhannathun (Arabia)
 Muxe (Mexico)
 Newhalf ("ニューハーフ") (Japan)
 Toms and dees (Thailand)
 Transgender in China
 Transgender people in Singapore
 Tom-Dee identity (Thailand)
 Albanian sworn virgins (Balkan)
 Takatāpui (Maori)
 Travesti (Brazil)
 Two-Spirit/"Berdache" (North America)
 Waria (Indonesia)
 Winkte (Native American)

Basic terms
 Sex and gender distinction
 Gender
 Bigender
 Cisgender
 Gender binary
 Gender blind
 Gender identity
 Gender dysphoria
Gender euphoria
 Gender role
 Real-life experience (transgender)
 Gender variance
 Non-binary
 Pangender
 Third gender
 Trigender

Sex
 Sex assignment
 Assigned female at birth
 Assigned male at birth
 Sexual characteristics
 Sex organ or primary sexual characteristics
 Secondary sex characteristics
 Sex-determination system

 Intersex
 Disorders of sex development
 Hermaphrodite

Sexual orientation and behaviour
Sexual orientation and behaviour are independent from gender identity; since both are often mentioned together or even confused, some relevant topics are mentioned here. The first article elaborates on this question.
 Sexual orientation
 LGBT culture also contains a section on transgender
 Sexuality and gender identity-based cultures
 Sexual identity
 LGBT
 Gay
 Lesbian
 Bisexuality
 Pansexuality
 Asexuality
 Heterosexuality

Other
 Heteronormativity
 Cisnormativity
 LGBT
 Discrimination against non-binary gender people
 Queer
 Transgender Day of Remembrance
 International Transgender Day of Visibility
 Transphobia
 Trans bashing
 Trans panic defense

Transitioning

Social
 Closeted
 Coming out
 Detransition
 Rapid onset gender dysphoria controversy
 Passing (gender)
 Questioning (sexuality and gender)
 Transition
 Transgender sexuality
 Gynephilia and androphilia
 Real-life experience (transgender)

Medical treatment
 Standards of Care for the Health of Transsexual, Transgender, and Gender Nonconforming People
 World Professional Association for Transgender Health (formerly known as the Harry Benjamin International Gender Dysphoria Association)
 Sex reassignment therapy
 Transgender hormone therapy
 Masculinizing hormone therapy
 Feminizing hormone therapy
 Sex reassignment surgery
 Sex reassignment surgery (female-to-male)
 Male chest reconstruction
 Phalloplasty
 Metoidioplasty
 Facial masculinization surgery
 Sex reassignment surgery (male-to-female)
Breast augmentation
Orchiectomy
Facial feminization surgery
Trachea shave
Vaginoplasty
Voice feminization
Transgender voice therapy

Law and rights 
 Transgender rights
 Legal recognition of non-binary gender
 Name change
 List of transgender-rights organizations
 Yogyakarta Principles
 History

By country
 Argentina
 Transgender rights in Argentina
Australia 
 Transgender rights in Australia
 Re Kevin – validity of marriage of transsexual
Brazil
 Transgender rights in Brazil
 Canada
 An Act to amend the Canadian Human Rights Act and the Criminal Code
 Transgender rights in Canada
 China
 Transgender in China
 Germany
 Transgender rights in Germany
 India
 Rights of Transgender Persons Bill, 2014
 Transgender rights in Tamil Nadu
 Iran
 Transsexuality in Iran
 Ireland
 Transgender rights in Ireland
 New Zealand
 Transgender rights in New Zealand
 Singapore
 Transgender people in Singapore
 South Africa
 Alteration of Sex Description and Sex Status Act, 2003
 Turkey
 March against Homophobia and Transphobia
 United Kingdom
 Transgender rights in the United Kingdom
 Gender Recognition Act 2004
 Gender Recognition Panel
 United States
 Compton's Cafeteria riot
 Gender identity under Title IX
 History of transgender people in the United States
 Transgender disenfranchisement in the United States
 Transgender legal history in the United States
 Transgender rights in the United States
 Transphobia in the United States

Discrimination
 Anti-gender movement
 Bathroom bill
 Discrimination against non-binary people
 Discrimination against transgender men
 History of violence against LGBT people in the United States
 List of people killed for being transgender
 Trans bashing
 Transmisogyny
 Transphobia
 Transgender inequality
 Violence against LGBT people

Medicine
 Transgender health care
 Gender dysphoria
 Gender dysphoria in children
 Sexual relationship disorder
 Sexual maturation disorder
 Ego-dystonic sexual orientation
 Body integrity identity disorder

Classification and causes
 Causes of transsexuality
 Classification of transsexual people
 Feminine essence concept of transsexuality

Sexual diversity studies
 Anima (Jung)
 Feminine essence concept of transsexuality
 Feminism
 Feminist views on transgender and transsexual people
 Gender studies
 Queer studies
 Queer theory
 Transfeminism

Scholars
 Judith Butler
 Leslie Feinberg
 Eve Kosofsky Sedgwick
 Susan Stryker

Society

Art
Transgender art and artists include:
 Transgender literature
 New Media Art:
 Sandy Stone (artist) – ACT Lab
 Shu Lea Cheang – Brandon
 Performance:
S. Bear Bergman
 Kate Bornstein
 Micha Cárdenas
 Willi Pape
 Music:
 Transgender representation in hip hop music
 Butterfly Music Transgender Chorus
 Genesis P-Orridge
 Ryan Cassata
 Laura Jane Grace
 Sophie
 Cavetown (musician)
 List of Transgender Woman Musicians
 Photography:
 Claude Cahun
 Loren Cameron
 Yishay Garbasz
 Film:
 Barbara Hammer – Lover Other

Media
 Transgender publications
 Media portrayals of transgender people

Film and television
 List of transgender characters in film and television
 Cross-dressing in film and television

Comics
 Assigned Male
 Claudine...!
 Wandering Son
 Rain

Books

 Last Exit To Brooklyn by Hubert Selby, Jr. one of the stories revolve around a group of transvestites, led by a girl named Georgette.
 Masculinities Without Men? by Jean Bobby Noble
 Armistead Maupin's Tales of the City series includes a transgender person as a central character.
 Luna by Julie Anne Peters
 Whipping Girl by Julia Serano
 Becoming, a gender flip book by Yishay Garbasz a flip book with images of the artist one year before and one year after her gender affirmation surgery.

Sport
 Transgender people in sports
 Sex verification in sports

Religion
 Transgender people and religion
 Christianity and transgender

Military service
 Transgender people and military service
 Transgender personnel in the United States military

Gender-variant people or behaviour
Many other terms describe gender-variant people or behaviour, without the people being described necessarily being transgender:

 Amazon
 Eunuch
 Butch and femme
 Tomboy

Religion
 The cult of Aphroditus, the androgynous Amathusian Aphrodite in Greek mythology.
 Galli, the transgender priests of the Phrygian goddess Cybele and her consort Attis.
 The Sisters of Perpetual Indulgence, a group of (mostly) gay male nuns who take vows to promulgate universal joy and expiate stigmatic guilt.
 Skoptsy, religious sect in early 20th Century imperial Russia that practiced castration and mastectomies.

Miscellaneous
 Homelessness among LGBT youth in the United States
 International Day Against Homophobia, Transphobia and Biphobia
 Stonewall riots
 Transgender flags
 LGBT people in prison

References

 
LGBT
LGBT
LGBT-related lists